Ellen Hagan is a Ghanaian entrepreneur, human resource practitioner and the CEO of L’aine Services Limited. She is married to Mr Gilbert Hagan.

Education 
She was educated at the Wesley Girls High School in Cape Coast in the Central Region of Ghana before graduating from the University Of Ghana. She holds an MBA from the Graduate School of University Of Leicester.

Business career 
Dr Ellen pursued her dream from being an employee to becoming an employer by establishing L’aine Services Limited She also co-founded the Legacy Leadership Girls School in Akuse.

She partners with the counselling unit of University of Ghana, Central University and Ashesi University to offer presentations on the corporate world, internship programs and how to run them well.

Dr Ellen serves on several boards including the University of Ghana Business School board and the Danish Sounding board. She was formally a delegation to ILO conferences on several occasions representing the Ghana Employers Association.

Awards 
 CIMG Marketing Woman Of The Year 2011
 Strategic Leadership Awards 2011 World HRD Congress in India.
 Africa's Most Influential Woman In Business 2013
 The Ultimate Woman Of The Year at the 2017 Emy Awards
 Women Arising Entrepreneur Of The Year 2017

Writings 
 Soft Skills; What Gives One Job Seeker An Edge Over Another
 All About Job Interviews
 Why are you here

References 

Living people
University of Ghana alumni
Alumni of the University of Leicester
People educated at Wesley Girls' Senior High School
Women chief executives
Ghanaian chief executives
Year of birth missing (living people)
Ghanaian business executives